Northern Sound System (NSS) is a dedicated youth centre focused on music, broadcasting, and other creative industries, located in Elizabeth, a northern suburb of Adelaide, South Australia.

Background

The Northern Sound System was established in 2007 by the City of Playford, assisted by funding from the Australian Government, and is located in a converted basketball stadium at 71 Elizabeth Way, Elizabeth. Created partly to help high youth unemployment in the area, it gives young people the opportunities to learn skills they might not acquire elsewhere.

Programs and facilities
NSS has offered programs, courses or workshops in various skills, including DJ, hip hop music, youth choir, gaming and animation; songwriting and music production. Some of the programs are run as after-school programs. One of the lead music educators at the centre is member of synth-pop band Heaps Good Friends, Nick O'Connor.

It includes recording studios, a live music venue accommodating around 400 people, spaces for rehearsal, and provides opportunities for young people to develop their musical talents and connect with people in the music industry and audiences. It also has facilities for live broadcasts, and caters for the creation of content for podcasts, YouTube, radio programs, and Twitch streaming.

Events and collaborations
The collaboration came about through Adelaide and Katowice both being UNESCO Cities of Music.

In December 2020, a project called Pixelated North was launched, which involved the creation of NSS within the videogame Minecraft by young people at NSS.

WOMADelaide collaboration
In January 2021, NSS partnered with WOMADelaide in a collaboration known as WOMADelaide x NSS Academy, to provide training and development program for emerging Aboriginal South Australians and multicultural artists. The year-long programme was developed in partnership with Aboriginal-owned production company Balya Productions, includes workshops, masterclasses and live gigs, and aims to provide connections to professional mentors for 10 local musicians or groups, to help them develop performing skills.

The program identified 10 artists in its first year or operation, with MRLN x RKM (Marlon Motlop and Rulla Kelly-Mansell) supporting Vika & Linda and Midnight Oil at WOMADelaide, held at King Rodney Park that year. Other artists involved in the 2021 programme included:

Jimmy Jamal Okello, aka Sokel
Barnaba$
Elsy Wameyo
Estee Evangeline
Katie Aspel
Tilly Tjala Thomas
Dem Mob
Sonz of Serpent

Sokel, Elsy Wameyo and Sonz of Serpent performed on the Zoo Stage and Frome Park Pavilion at  Botanic Park at WOMAD in 2022.

In the second round of WOMADelaide x NSS Academy, seven artists were selected in mid-2022, including Dem Mob, singer-songwriter Elizabeth Ruyi, Sierra Leone-born singer-songwriter WaiKid, and Maori hip hop artist Taiaha.

Recognition
In 2018, educator Nick O'Connor was awarded the Geoff Crowhurst Memorial Award at the Ruby Awards, in recognition of his "outstanding contribution to community cultural development".

In November 2021, WOMADelaide x NSS Academy won the Best Innovation award at the South Australian Music Awards.

Alumni
Alumni of the centre not mentioned above include:
 Tkay Maidza
 Pinkish Blu
 George Alice
 Teenage Joans
 DyspOra
 TOWNS

References

External links

NSS on YouTube

Music education organizations
2007 establishments in Australia
Music venues in Australia